Glamorgan Constabulary, or Glamorganshire Constabulary, was the Home Office police force for the county of Glamorgan, Wales.

The force was formed in 1841. It absorbed Neath Borough Police in 1947

In 1965, the force had an establishment of 1,153 and an actual strength of 1,055, making it by far the largest police force in Wales.

In 1969, the force amalgamated with Cardiff City Police, Swansea Borough Police and Merthyr Tydfil Borough Police (which had seceded from it in 1908) to form South Wales Constabulary.

Chief Constables
 1841–1867 : Captain Charles Napier
 1867–1891 : Henry Gore Lindsay
 1891–1936 : Lionel Arthur Lindsay
 1936–1951 : Joseph Jones
 1951– : Cecil Haydn Watkins

Footnotes

References
South Wales Police Museum

Defunct police forces of Wales
History of Glamorgan
1841 establishments in Wales
1969 disestablishments in Wales